Greg Morris (born April 25, 1964) is an American politician from Georgia. Morris is a former Democratic member and a former Republican member of Georgia House of Representatives.

Early life 
Morris was born on April 25, 1964 in Vidalia, Georgia. Morris attended Robert Toombs Christian Academy.

Education 
Morris earned a Bachelor of Arts degree in Political Science from University of Georgia.

Career

Toombs County Commission (1992-1995)
In 1992, Morris was elected to the Toombs County Commission. He served there until 1995.

Georgia State Senate (1995-1999)
Morris was elected to the Georgia State Senate from the 20th district in 1994. His term began in January 1995. In 1998 he ran for the state house instead of running for another state senate term. On January 11, 1999 his State Senate term ended.

Georgia House of Representatives (1999-Present)
Morris was elected to the Georgia House of Representatives from the 155th district in 1998 as a Democrat. His first term began on January 11, 1999. In 2005, he switched from the Democratic Party to the Republican Party.

On November 6, 2012, Morris won the election unopposed and became a Republican member of Georgia House of Representatives from District 156. On November 4, 2014, as an incumbent, Morris won the election unopposed and continued serving District 156.  On November 3, 2020, as an incumbent, as an incumbent, Morris won the election unopposed and continued serving District 156.

146th Georgia General Assembly (2001-2002)
Morris served on the following committees during the 146th Georgia General Assembly:
Game, Fish, & Parks
Transportation Committee

2008 election
Morris ran unopposed in both the primary and the general election, winning re-election with 13,462 votes.

150th Georgia General Assembly (2009-2010)
Morris served on the following committees during the 150th Georgia General Assembly:
Code Review, Chair
Natural Resources and Environment, Vice Chair
Appropriations
Banks and Banking
Rules

2010 election
Morris ran unopposed in both the primary and the general election, winning re-election with 9,230 votes.

151st Georgia General Assembly (2011-2012)
Morris served on the following committees during the 151st Georgia General Assembly:
Banks and Banking, Chair
Appropriations
Code Revision
Natural Resources and Environment
Rules

2012 election
Morris ran unopposed in both the primary and the general election, winning re-election with 14,499 votes. Due to redistricting, Morris now represented the 156th district.

152nd Georgia General Assembly (2013-2014)
Morris served on the following committees during the 152nd Georgia General Assembly:
Banks and Banking, Chair
Appropriations
Code Revision
Natural Resources and Environment
Rules

2014 election

2014 primary election
Despite having the advantage of incumbency, Morris only won by 1%, facing a tough primary challenge from D.L. “Lee” Burton.

153rd Georgia General Assembly (2015-2016)
Morris served on the following committees during the 153rd Georgia General Assembly:

Banks and Banking, Chair
Code Revision
Natural Resources and Environment
Rules

2016 election

2016 primary election
Morris won again against Lee Burton, this time by 8.7 percent.

2016 general election
Morris ran unopposed in the 2016 general election, winning with 15,485 votes.

154th Georgia General Assembly (2017-2018)
Morris served on the following committees during the 154th Georgia General Assembly:
Banks and Banking, Chair
Code Revision
Natural Resources and Environment
Rules

2018 election

2018 primary election
Morris faced Lee Burton yet again in the primary, but this time he beat Burton in a landslide, winning by 41 percent.

2018 general election
Morris ran unopposed in the 2018 election, winning with 15,430 votes.

155th Georgia General Assembly (2019-Present)
Morris served on the following committees during the 155th Georgia General Assembly:
Banks and Banking, Chair
Code Revision
Natural Resources and Environment
Rules

2020 Election

2020 primary election 
Morris ran unopposed in the 2020 primary, winning with 8,880 votes.

2020 general election
Morris ran unopposed in the 2020 election, winning with 19,096 votes.

Political Positions
Morris is generally conservative, with a 70% conservative rating from the American Conservative Union as of 2019. In 2010 he was given a “A” rating by the National Rifle Association Political Victory Fund. Morris has generated controversy for a welfare food stamp drug test bill (Georgia House Bill 772). Morris has also been criticized for breaking with party line and voting for a tax increase.

Personal life 
Morris' wife is Amy Morris. They have two children. Morris and his family live in Vidalia, Georgia.

See also 
 146th Georgia General Assembly#Members of the Georgia State House of Representatives, 2001–2002

References

1964 births
Living people
Republican Party members of the Georgia House of Representatives
Republican Party Georgia (U.S. state) state senators
21st-century American politicians
People from Vidalia, Georgia
University of Georgia alumni